Chorivalva is a genus of moths in the class Gelechiidae.

Species
 Chorivalva bisaccula Omelko, 1988
 Chorivalva grandialata Omelko, 1988
 Chorivalva unisaccula Omelko, 1988

References

Litini
Moth genera